A Multitude of Angels is a four-CD collection of solo piano performances by Keith Jarrett recorded in Italy in October 1996 and released by ECM Records twenty years later.

According to ECM, these performances document "the conclusion of Keith Jarrett's experiments with long-form improvisation in performances" and, as Jarrett explains in his liner notes, these were his last concerts with no breaks within each set.

Music and recording 
The music comes from four concerts recorded in Italy: in Modena, Ferrara, Torino, and Genova, on October 23, 25, 28, and 30, 1996, respectively. Jarrett recorded the concerts himself on a DAT machine. Each consists of one performance without breaks; these were among the last times that Jarrett took this approach to performance. After the concerts, he withdrew from playing in public, because of chronic fatigue syndrome.

Release and reception 
A Multitude of Angels was released by ECM Records on November 4, 2016.
John Fordham of The Guardian commented that, "Jarrett has always favoured exhaustive documentation, but the intensity, variety, and astonishing technical command of these performances might well persuade devoted fans and intrigued improv enthusiasts alike of his view that these were landmark moments".

John Garratt of PopMatters wrote that, "The four-disc box set A Multitude of Angels is the new turning point in Jarrett's career where he pushed himself too hard. His temporary illness is our gain. [...It] tells the music world what Keith Jarrett fans already knew – that the man could be an endless fountain of music, a one-man jam-band that only needed 88 keys to balance the Law of Fate with the Law of Accident (according to his liner notes). Since that's the case, this box will not alter anyone's perception of Jarrett or change his reputation overall."

Track listing

References 

ECM Records live albums
Keith Jarrett live albums
2016 live albums